Freziera suberosa is a species of plant in the Pentaphylacaceae family. It is found in Colombia and Ecuador.

References

suberosa
Vulnerable plants
Taxonomy articles created by Polbot